Masoumeh Abad (born 5 September 1962) is an Iranian author, university professor, and conservative politician.
She was a member of the fourth Islamic City Council of Tehran and it's Director of Health Division. Abad is also the author of the book I'm Alive.

Captivity
During the Iran–Iraq War, Abad played a significant role in the construction and management of hospitals and other medical clinics for the Iranian Red Crescent Society (IRCS). Thirty-three days after the start of the war, when she was 17 years, old Masoumeh Abad, Fatemeh Nahidi, Maryam Bahrami and Halimeh Azmoudehwere captured by the Iraqi military forces on Mahshahr to Abadan's high way (15 October 1980). They were on Red Crescent mission. At first, Abad, Nahidi, Bahrami and Azmoudeh were sent to Tanoumeh border camp and then they were sent to Estekhbarat (secret agency of Saddam) and Al-Rashid prisons. Again after sometime, Abad and her companions were moved to Mosul and Al-Anbar camps. Three years and six months later, on 21 April 1983, Abad was released.

I'm Alive is a memoir by Masoumeh Abad detailing her experiences during the Iran–Iraq War. The book is Abad's captivity memoir in prison. This book has received an award in the 16th Ketab-e-Sale-Defa-Moghadas of the year award in Iran. This book discusses some of the roles of Iranian women who participated in the war.

Education
Abad holds a BSc degree in midwifery from Iran University of Medical Sciences in 1989, a MSc in Hygiene from Iran University of Medical Sciences in 1996 and PhD in Hygiene from Shahid Beheshti University in 2011.

See also 
 Majid Gheisari
 Tahereh Saffarzadeh
 Ahad Gudarziani
 Holy Defense Year Book Award
 Mohammad Doroudian
 Saeed Akef
 Hamid Reza Shekarsari

Footnotes

External links 
  Ayatollah Khamenei about the book “I’m Alive”

Persian women writers
Female wartime nurses
1962 births
Persian nurses
Iranian women academics
Living people
Iranian memoirists
Politicians from Tehran
Writers from Tehran
Shahid Chamran University of Ahvaz alumni
Iranian prisoners of war
Iranian torture victims
Recipients of the Holy Defense Year Book Award
Iranian women writers
Alliance of Builders of Islamic Iran politicians
Society of Devotees of the Islamic Revolution politicians
Popular Front of Islamic Revolution Forces politicians
21st-century Iranian women politicians
21st-century Iranian politicians
Iran–Iraq War prisoners of war
Tehran Councillors 2013–2017
Tehran Councillors 2007–2013
Women memoirists
Prisoners of war held by Iraq